Muilenburg is a Dutch surname. Notable people with the surname include:

Dennis Muilenburg (born 1964), American engineer, businessman, and former CEO of Boeing
James Muilenburg (1896–1974), American Bible scholar

Surnames of Dutch origin